The men's K-2 1000 metres event was a pairs kayaking event conducted as part of the Canoeing at the 1960 Summer Olympics program on Lake Albano.

Medalists

Results

Heats
The 23 crews first raced in three heats on August 26. The top three finishers from each heat advanced directly to the semifinals while the remaining 14 teams were relegated to the repechage heats.

Canada's time in heat two not shown in the official report while Luxembourg and Switzerland are switched in the official report in heat three though the athletes for both countries were in the correct finishing position in the report.

Repechages
The top three finishers in each of the three repechages, which took place on August 27, advanced to the semifinals.

Norway's time in the first repechage was not listed in the official report.

Semifinals
The top three finishers in each of the three semifinals (raced on August 28) advanced to the final while the remaining teams were eliminated.

Final
The final was held on August 29, 1960.

References
1960 Summer Olympics official report Volume 2, Part 1. pp. 251–3.
Sports-reference.com 1960 K-2 1000 m results.

Men's K-2 1000
Men's events at the 1960 Summer Olympics